Grzegorz Bogdan Skawiński (July 6, 1954, Mława) is a Polish pop-rock musician, guitarist, singer, composer and record producer. He was the leader of the band O.N.A., and is a member of the Phonographic Academy ZPAV.

Skawiński graduated from Wyspiański High School in Mława, where he met Waldemar Tkaczyk. Together they founded the band Kameleon. In 1974 both musicians were members of the band Akcenty, which became Kombi. The group disbanded in 1992. At the end of the 1980s he began a solo career as Skawiński, and in 1991 along with Waldemar Tkaczyk, Zbigniew Kraszewski and Piotr Łukaszewski founded the group Skawalker.

Discography

Solo albums

References

1954 births
Polish male guitarists
Polish rock singers
Polish pop singers
Polish keyboardists
Polish record producers
People from Mława
Living people
English-language singers from Poland
Polish lyricists
20th-century Polish male  singers
21st-century Polish male singers
21st-century Polish singers